Rhinolophus huananus  is a species of horseshoe bat endemic to southern China.

References

Rhinolophidae
Mammals of China
Mammals described in 2008
Bats of Asia